The Taipei Economic and Cultural Centre; (Portuguese: Centro Económico e Cultural de Taipei) represents the interests of Taiwan in Portugal in the absence of formal diplomatic relations, functioning as a de facto embassy.

There is currently no counterpart organisation representing Portugal in Taipei.

The Centre was established in 1992. 
It is headed by a Representative, Vivia Chun-Fei Chang.

In addition to responsibility for Portugal, including the Autonomous Regions of the Azores and Madeira, it also has responsibility Cape Verde, Guinea-Bissau and São Tomé and Príncipe in Africa.

History
From 1950 to 1975, Portugal recognised Taiwan as the Republic of China, which had a legation in Lisbon, as well as a Consulate in Dili in the then Portuguese Timor. In March 1975, following the Carnation Revolution the previous year, the new Portuguese government ordered Taipei to close its Legation. Portugal later established diplomatic relations with the People's Republic of China in 1979.

Taiwan was also represented in Macau when it was under Portuguese administration by the "Special Commissariat of the Ministry of Foreign Affairs of the Republic of China". However, following the "12-3" riots in 1966, the Portuguese government agreed to close its office down.

See also
 List of diplomatic missions of Taiwan
 List of diplomatic missions in Portugal

References

External links
 Centro Económico e Cultural de Taipei

Portugal
Taiwan
1992 establishments in Portugal
Diplomatic missions in Lisbon
Organizations established in 1992